Chi Shu-ju (born 27 November 1982) is a Taiwanese taekwondo practitioner and Olympic medalist. She competed at the 2000 Summer Olympics in Sydney where she received a bronze medal in the 49 kg class.

References

External links
 
 

1982 births
Living people
Taekwondo practitioners at the 2000 Summer Olympics
Taekwondo practitioners at the 2004 Summer Olympics
Olympic taekwondo practitioners of Taiwan
Olympic bronze medalists for Taiwan
Olympic medalists in taekwondo
Asian Games medalists in taekwondo
Taekwondo practitioners at the 1998 Asian Games
Taiwanese female taekwondo practitioners
Medalists at the 2000 Summer Olympics
Universiade medalists in taekwondo
Asian Games bronze medalists for Chinese Taipei
Medalists at the 1998 Asian Games
Universiade bronze medalists for Chinese Taipei
World Taekwondo Championships medalists
Medalists at the 2003 Summer Universiade
21st-century Taiwanese women